Clytocosmus is a genus of true crane fly.

Distribution
Australia.

Species
C. alexanderi Dobrotworsky, 1968
C. edwardsi Alexander, 1922
C. helmsi Skuse, 1890
C. lichtwardti Riedel, 1920
C. nichollsi Paramonov, 1953
C. tillyardi Alexander, 1920

References

Tipulidae
Tipuloidea genera
Diptera of Australasia